Sir Robert Sheffield (before 1462 – 10 August 1518) was an English lawyer and Member of Parliament. He was Speaker of the House of Commons between 1512–1513.

Family
Robert Sheffield was the son of Sir Robert Sheffield of South Cave, Yorkshire, by Jane Lounde, the daughter and coheir of Alexander Lownde of Butterwick, Lincolnshire.

Career
He was trained in the law at the Inner Temple, and became Governor of the Inner Temple in 1511. He served as Recorder of London from 1495 to 1508, and was thus an ex officio Member of Parliament for the City of London in 1495, 1497 and 1504. Bernard Andreas states that Sheffield resigned the recordership in April 1508.

He was a commander at Blackheath during the Cornish Rebellion of 1497, and knighted by Henry VII after the battle.

Sheffield was chosen Knight of the Shire for Lincolnshire in 1512 and 1513. During these years, he served as Speaker of the House of Commons.

In 1515, Sheffield helped Cardinal Wolsey in drafting legislation but later gave lead to anti-clerical forces in the House, earning him the Cardinal's enmity. In 1516, he was charged with negligence as a justice of the peace and was summoned before the Star Chamber but negotiated a pardon. Six months later he was incarcerated in the Tower of London after complaining against Cardinal Wolsey, and brought before the Star Chamber again, and this time asked the King for mercy. However the pardon was revoked and he died in the Tower of London on 10 August 1518.  He was buried in the Augustinian church (Blackfriars), London. His will is in Testamenta Vetusta by Nicholas Harris Nicolas (p. 555).

Marriages and issue
Sheffield married firstly Ellen Delves, the daughter and heir of Sir John Delves of Doddington, Cheshire, by whom he had a son and heir, Robert Sheffield (d.1531), who married Jane Stanley, daughter of George Stanley, 9th Baron Strange, and sister of Thomas Stanley, 2nd Earl of Derby, and four daughters. Edmund Sheffield, the son of Robert Sheffield (d.1531) and Jane Stanley, became first Baron Sheffield in 1547.

After his first wife's death in or after 1509, Sheffield married secondly Anne Barley or Barlee (d. 1557 or 1558), the daughter of William Barley, of Albury, Hertfordshire. After Sheffield's death in 1518 his widow married secondly Sir John Grey of Blisworth, Northamptonshire, a younger son of Thomas Grey, 1st Marquess of Dorset by his second wife, Cecily Bonville, and thirdly Sir Richard Clement, of Ightham Mote, Kent. Anne (née Barlee) left a will dated 1 October 1557, proved 7 May 1558.

See also
Sheffield baronets, including other persons called "Sir Robert Sheffield"

Notes

References

  

15th-century births
1518 deaths
Year of birth unknown
People from the Borough of Boston
People from the East Riding of Yorkshire (before 1974)
Prisoners in the Tower of London
Speakers of the House of Commons of England
16th-century English lawyers
Recorders of London
Members of the Parliament of England for the City of London
English MPs 1495
English MPs 1497
English MPs 1504
English MPs 1512–1514
English MPs 1515
Robert